Home Credit B.V. is an international non-bank financial institution founded in 1997 in the Czech Republic and headquartered in Netherlands. The company operates in 9 countries and focuses on installment lending primarily to people with little or no credit history. As of 30 June 2020 the Group has cumulatively served over 135.4 million customers. Major shareholder of the Group is PPF, a privately held international investment group whose founder and major beneficiary was Petr Kellner with 88.62% stake.

The Home Credit loan can be obtained from throughout 342.7 thousands partnering retail shops and shopping malls in ten world markets as well as at the Home Credit's own online marketplaces (Russia, China, Philippines and Vietnam). Home Credit is also presented online in its own mobile application or in a third-party online stores. In selected markets you can pay with a „HC Pay“, a QR code-based revolving credit or with Home Credit credit or shopping cards. Home Credit finances both the purchase of consumer goods through a cash-less loan transaction or other commodities, such as language courses, travel etc. through a cash loans. The loans are always issued in domestic currency of the market in which the brand operates.

History 
In 1997, Home Credit a.s. was founded in the Czech Republic and in 1999, the company expanded to Slovakia. In 2000s company started to expand to Commonwealth of Independent States countries - Russia, Kazakhstan, Ukraine and Belarus. As of 2007 the company was the second largest consumer lender in Russia. In 2010s company expanded to Asia, specifically China, India, Indonesia, Philippines and Vietnam. In 2010 the company was the first foreign company to set up as a consumer finance lender in China. In 2015 Home Credit Group launched its operations in the United States of America through a partnership with Sprint Corporation. The group offers loans in 434,232 retail stores and also in digital space.

In 2017 PAG initiated investment of 2 billion RMB into Home Credit Group's Chinese business entity as an interest-bearing convertible loan. The deal was subsequently terminated in 2018 by PAG and Home Credit Group repaid the loan with interest.

In 2018 Home Credit Group initiated sale of its Czech operation consisting of Home Credit Czech and Slovak and Air Bank to Moneta Money Bank. The deal was criticized as one-sided deal that gives Home Credit's subsidiaries unusually high valuation with unusual terms of the deal that would lead to renaming of Moneta Bank to Air Bank. The criticism was strengthened also because of Moneta Chief Executive Tomas Spurny being historically connected to Home Credit Group majority shareholder PPF Group. In February 2019, Moneta based on feedback from its shareholders revised offer with lower valuation. In October 2019, Home Credit India has tied up with The Karur Vysya Bank Ltd, a commercial bank having its head office at Karur, Tamil Nadu, India for joint lending.

In 2019, the company was preparing IPO in Hong Kong, however it was scrapped after investors estimated the value between 5 and 7.5 billion euros, whereas shareholders were targeting market capitalization of 10 billion euros.

Home Credit China 
Home Credit entered China in 2007 and applied for a pilot consumer finance license in 2010. Home Credit was asked by Chinese officials to help improve relationship between China and the Czech Republic in order to receive full license. Since 2010, Home Credit's parent company PPF helped swing anti-communist international relations sentiment towards strong China ally. In 2014, PPF helped arrange visit of the Czech president Miloš Zeman to China and subsequently helped pay for private plane for the return trip. The company in 2014 also received nation-wide license for consumer finance lending. In 2016, the company CEO Jiří Šmejc claimed to be proud of the impact on the revival of Czech-Chinese relations. Home Credit funded a newly formed think tank, Sinoskop, to counter a longer-established China-watching body, Sinopsis.

Criticism 
In 2019, it was uncovered that Home Credit paid public relations company to influence public in opinion in the Czech Republic about China. Home Credit did hire an agency called C&B Reputation Management, which did marketing for Home Credit. It was also supposed to improve the Czech view of the Chinese communist regime.

References

External links 

 

Financial services companies established in 1997
Financial services companies of the Czech Republic
Companies based in Amsterdam
PPF Group